The 1965 Lowood 4 Hour was an endurance motor race held at the Lowood circuit in Queensland, Australia on 28 March 1965. The race, which was organised by the Queensland Racing Drivers Club, was the second annual Lowood 4 Hour. It was open to Production Touring Cars which had been manufactured after 28 March 1961, 100 examples of which had been registered in Australia by the closing date for entries. The field was divided into four classes according to the retail price of each vehicle. There were 33 starters in the event.

Although the Morris Cooper S driven by John Harvey and Brian Foley took "line honours", outright results were not officially recognised and official results were only issued for class placings.

Results

Note: Car 51 was eligible for the race under a Lowood pro-rata clause.

References

Further reading 
 Lowood's 4-hour lap charts to be checked, The Courier Mail, Monday, 29 March 1965, pages 17
 Wins to Cortinas & Morris, The Courier Mail, Thursday, 1 April 1965, page 22

Lowood 4 Hour
Lowood 4 Hour